Paul Kahn is a former professional rugby league footballer who played in the 1970s. He played at club level for Castleford (Heritage No. 580).

Playing career

BBC2 Floodlit Trophy Final appearances
Paul Kahn played left-, i.e. number 8, in Castleford's 12–4 victory over Leigh in the 1976 BBC2 Floodlit Trophy Final during the 1976–77 season at Hilton Park, Leigh on Tuesday 14 December 1976.

Player's No.6 Trophy Final appearances
Paul Kahn played left-, i.e. number 8, in Castleford's 25–15 victory over Blackpool Borough in the 1976–77 Player's No.6 Trophy Final during the 1976–77 season at The Willows, Salford on Saturday 22 January 1977.

References

External links
Search for "Kahn" at rugbyleagueproject.org
Paul Kahn Memory Box Search at archive.castigersheritage.com

Living people
Castleford Tigers players
English rugby league players
Place of birth missing (living people)
Year of birth missing (living people)
Rugby league props